Tomu may be either of two Papuan languages:
a variety of the Arandai language
an alternative name for the Odoodee language